Bakerganj (বাকেরগঞ্জ) is a town in Barisal District, Barisal Division, Bangladesh.

References

Barishal District
Barishal Division